The National Holocaust Monument (French: Monument national de l'Holocauste) is a Holocaust memorial in Ottawa, Ontario, across from the Canadian War Museum at the northeast corner of Wellington and Booth Streets, and about 1.5 km away from Parliament Hill. The memorial has been designed by Daniel Libeskind.

The National Holocaust Monument Act (Bill C-442), which established plans to create the memorial in Canada's capital, received Royal Assent on March 25, 2011. The law was introduced as a private members bill by Tim Uppal, Minister of State and MP for Edmonton—Sherwood Park and received unanimous support.

The monument features a view of the Peace Tower and photographs by Edward Burtynsky. The team was led by Lord Cultural Resources.

The monument is overseen by the National Capital Commission.

The monument was planned to be unveiled in the fall of 2015, but later pushed back to the spring of 2017 due to delays in construction. The official unveiling occurred on September 27, 2017. In 2017, when the National Holocaust Monument of Canada was unveiled in Ottawa, the opening plaque made no mention of the six million Jews killed by the Nazis. Subsequently, chair Rabbi Daniel Friedman took responsibility for the error. 

The monument was built due to the persistent activism of former University of Ottawa student, Laura Grosman. Laura began advocating for a monument to be built commemorating the Nazis atrocities and as a beacon of light for Canadian Holocaust survivors. She campaigned and met with various Members of Parliament to support the introduction of a Private Members Bill. She is the granddaughter of a Polish-born Holocaust survivor.

See also

 Antisemitism in Canada
 List of Holocaust memorials and museums
 Montreal Holocaust Memorial Centre
 Museum of Jewish Montreal

References

External links

Debating Canada's National Holocaust Monument

2017 establishments in Ontario
2017 sculptures
Daniel Libeskind buildings
Holocaust memorials
Jewish museums in Canada
Jews and Judaism in Ottawa
Monuments and memorials in Ottawa
National Capital Commission